Gogó Rojo (née Gladys del Valle Rojo Castro; 7 December 1942 – 26 July 2021) was a former vedette, actress and dancer. She was the younger sister of the actress Ethel Rojo. She appeared in Maridos en Vacaciones and Hay Que Romper la Rutina with Alberto Olmedo.

Filmography 
 1962: The Sadistic Baron Von Klaus 
 1962: Mi adorable esclava
 1963: Esa pícara pelirroja
 1965: Whisky y vodka
 1969: Cry Chicago
 1970: Crimen imperfecto
 1971: El apartamento de la tentación
 1972: La cera virgen
 1972: Alta tensión
 1973: Casa Flora
 1974: Los amantes de la isla del diablo
 1974: Los caballeros del botón de ancla
 1974: Hay que romper la rutina
 1975: Maridos en vacaciones

References

External links

1942 births
2021 deaths
Argentine vedettes
People from Santiago del Estero